"If It's All the Same to You" is a single by American country music artists Bill Anderson and Jan Howard.  Released in October 1969, it was the first single and title track from their album If It's All the Same to You. The song reached #2 on the Billboard Hot Country Singles chart. The single became the duo's fourth charted duet. The song additionally peaked at #8 on the Canadian RPM Country Tracks chart.

Chart performance

References 

1969 singles
Bill Anderson (singer) songs
Jan Howard songs
Songs written by Bill Anderson (singer)
Song recordings produced by Owen Bradley
1969 songs